The McFarland-Render House, also known as Magnolias or The Magnolias Plantation, is a one-and-a-half-story Greek Revival-style plantation home in Newnan, Georgia. The McFarland-Render House was built from 1830 to 1833 by Collin Rodgers, a Troup County architect and craftsman. for Joseph D. McFarland, a physician from Scotland. 

The McFarland-Render House was documented by the Historic American Buildings Survey in 1936, and was listed on the National Register of Historic Places in 1978.

In 1997, the McFarland-Render House was moved from 612 Hines Street in LaGrange 32 miles northwest to 101 Bill Hart Road in Newnan, Georgia. After the move and extensive renovation, the home and its new owner were featured in the October 1999 issue of House Beautiful magazine.

Gallery

References

National Register of Historic Places in Troup County, Georgia
Greek Revival architecture in Georgia (U.S. state)
Hotel buildings completed in 1833